John Stewart Tritle (March 22, 1871 – March 7, 1947) was an American businessman and tennis player. The son of Arizona Territory governor Frederick Augustus Tritle, Tritle directed the construction of the Louisiana Purchase Exposition and competed in the men's singles and doubles events at the 1904 Summer Olympics which were held as a part of the Exposition.

After the Exposition, he became the general manager of the Kansas City district of Westinghouse Electric Corporation, and retired as the Vice President for the Pittsburgh office.

References

External links
 

1871 births
1947 deaths
American male tennis players
Olympic tennis players of the United States
Tennis players at the 1904 Summer Olympics
People from Virginia City, Nevada
Tennis people from Nevada